The 5th Infantry Division (5-ya Pekhotnaya Diviziya) was an infantry formation of the Russian Imperial Army that existed in various formations from 1806 until the end of World War I and the Russian Revolution. When the war broke out in 1914 it was based in Zhytomyr and was part of the 9th Army Corps.

History 
It was formed in 1806 as the 6th Infantry Division and was later reorganized into the 5th Infantry Division. The division took part in the Russo-Turkish War of 1877-78 and fought near Plovdiv. It later served during World War I was demobilized around the time of the Russian Revolution and the subsequent unrest.

Organization 
Russian infantry divisions consisted of a staff, two infantry brigades, and one artillery brigade. The 5th Infantry Division was part of the 9th Army Corps as of 1914.
1st Brigade 
 17th His Imperial Highness Grand Duke Vladimir Alexandrovich's Archangel Infantry Regiment
 18th His Majesty the King of Romania's Vologda Infantry Regiment
2nd Brigade 
 19th Kostroma Infantry Regiment
 20th Galich Infantry Regiment
5th Artillery Brigade

Known commanders

Known chiefs of staff

References 

Infantry divisions of the Russian Empire
Military units and formations established in 1806
Military units and formations disestablished in 1918
Volhynian Governorate